Cristian Alejandro Aravena Viveros (born 7 March 1998) is a Chilean professional footballer who plays as a forward for Chilean Primera División side Coquimbo Unido.

Career
Mainly a left winger, as a child, Aravena was with Unión Española, then he moved to Santiago Morning and made his professional debut in the 1–0 loss against Deportes Copiapó for the 2017 Primera B de Chile in 9 September. For the club, he made 71 appearances and scored 7 goals until the 2021 season.

For the 2022 season, he moved to Coquimbo Unido in the Chilean Primera División. For the club, he scored his first goal in the derby versus Deportes La Serena in 23 July, what also was his first match as a starting player.

Personal life
Aravena is usually nicknamed Misil (Missile).

References

External links
 
 
 Cristian Aravena at PlaymakerStats

1998 births
Living people
Footballers from Santiago
Chilean footballers
Association football defenders
Santiago Morning footballers
Coquimbo Unido footballers
Primera B de Chile players
Chilean Primera División players